Ranch Road 1 (RR 1) is a Ranch Road located in Gillespie and Blanco counties, in the central region of the U.S. state of Texas. The road, designated in 1963, is the only road in the state that the Texas Department of Transportation (TxDOT) has designated as a "Ranch Road". In the earliest days of the state highway system, the route was a part of State Highway 20, and was later part of US 290 before that highway was relocated to the south.

Route description
Ranch Road 1 begins at US 290 on the west side of Stonewall, as a two-lane, paved road. The highway follows along the south bank of the Pedernales River around the town's north side and intersects RM 1623 on the town's east side. The route continues along the river briefly passing through a narrow southwestern portion of Lyndon B. Johnson National Historical Park, before entering Lyndon B Johnson State Park and Historic Site. The route crosses the length of the state park at its northern edge along the riverbank and exits the park before intersecting PR 49, which crosses the river accessing the national historic site. After crossing into Blanco County, the route turns away from the riverbank to the southeast returning to US 290 west of Hye. Although the road is located in the Texas Hill Country, the road only encounters gentle grades within the channel of the Pedernales River.

Classification
Ranch Road 1 is classified by TxDOT as a Ranch Road and is the only highway in the state currently categorized as such. The route is not officially part of the state's Farm and Ranch to Market Road System, although it is considered similar to the Farm to Market Road system. RR 1 is signed with a shield similar to a Ranch to Market Road.

History
The following year, the road was extended  eastward to its present terminus near Hye. The route was originally part of SH 20. In 1935, US 290 was routed over the road, and the SH 20 designation was dropped in the 1939 general redescription of the state highway system. US 290 was rerouted south to its current location sometime between 1941 and 1961.

Major intersections

See also

List of Recreational Roads in Texas

References

External links

0001
0001
Transportation in Gillespie County, Texas
Transportation in Blanco County, Texas